Esplantas (Auvergnat: Esplantats) is a former commune in the Haute-Loire department in south-central France. On 1 January 2016, it was merged into the new commune Esplantas-Vazeilles.

See also
Communes of the Haute-Loire department

References 

Former communes of Haute-Loire
Populated places disestablished in 2016